Pocono Mountain High School may refer to:

 Pocono Mountain East High School, in Pocono Mountain School District, at Pocono Mountain School Road, Swiftwater, Pennsylvania, which prior to 2002 was known as Pocono Mountain High School
 Pocono Mountain West High School, at Panther Lane, Pocono Summit, Pennsylvania, built to accommodate expansion